Curious George Goes to the Hospital is a children's picture book written and illustrated by Margret Rey and H. A. Rey and published by Houghton Mifflin in 1966. It is the seventh and final book in the original Curious George series, and tells the story of George's experiences in a hospital after swallowing a jigsaw puzzle piece. 

The book was inspired by employees at the Boston Children's Hospital, who reached out to the Cambridge-based Reys to ask for help in getting children to prepare for going to the hospital.

Plot
George wakes up to find a box labeled "surprise" on the desk, it contains a jigsaw puzzle. George opens the box, takes a puzzle piece out and, thinking it is a piece of candy, he swallows it. The Man with the Yellow Hat comes home and tells George that the puzzle is a present for him. They both assemble the puzzle, but notice that the last piece is missing. Unable to find the missing piece, they go to bed. The next morning, George has a stomachache and is unable to eat his breakfast. Worried, the Man calls the doctor. The doctor is unable to determine the problem and recommends that George should go to the hospital.

The Man reassures George at the hospital, reminding him of being here before when he broke his leg (referencing a previous story). George is given a barium drink from a nurse and then taken to the x-ray room.  The taken x-ray reveals the puzzle piece lodged in George's stomach, the Man with the Yellow Hat realizes that the last piece was missing because George had swallowed it. The doctor then tells George that a small operation is needed to remove it, and he has to stay for a few days. He reveals that a tube is needed to take the puzzle piece out of George's stomach.

Later, George is admitted to the waiting room where they meet Betsy and her mother. Betsy is scared and worried because this is her first time in a hospital. George meets a nurse named Carol, who takes him to the children's ward where George's temperature and blood pressure are recorded, and he is given a pill and a shot to put him to sleep then wheeled into surgery. After surgery, George is groggy and does not want to read a new book the Man brings him, and goes back to sleep.

When George wakes up the third day, he hangs out in the play area and puts on a puppet show. Later, he sees that Steve, a boy with a cast on his leg, is trying to walk. With no one looking, George hops into Steve's wheelchair and races down the corridors. By the time the nurse notices, George is heading down a steep ramp towards the hospital cafeteria. There, some attendants are pushing food carts and the mayor is touring the hospital. George crashes into the carts and lands in the mayor's arms, while spilling food and breaking the wheelchair and the dishes. The children see the accident and the first to laugh is Betsy. This gets everyone laughing except George who cries, thinking he might be punished. Betsy consoles George telling him that he has cheered her up. The adults agree George is not in trouble because he made Betsy no longer feel afraid, then the Man with the Yellow Hat arrives to take him home.

Before they leave, Nurse Carol gives George a package to take home. At home George finds it to be the puzzle piece he swallowed, he is happy that the doctor and nurse had saved it for them. Now able to finish the puzzle, he and the Man place the last missing piece in the center of it. The now-completed puzzle reveals to be a picture of George on the grass of the jungle with the Man's yellow hat in front of him.

Notes

References
 

1966 children's books
American picture books
Curious George
Houghton Mifflin books
Works set in hospitals